Philip Hickie (1927–2012) was an Australian set designer who worked extensively on Australian theatre and television. He also worked in England.

He was one of the first two designers for ABC TV and head of division of design at The National Art School.

Select Credits
Harlequinade (1961)

References

External links
Philip Hickie at IMDb
Philip Hickie at Ausstage
Philip Hickie at BFI

1927 births
2012 deaths
Australian designers
Australian expatriates in the United Kingdom